Telosh Howard is an American former Negro league pitcher who played in the 1930s.

A native of Macon, Georgia, Howard played several seasons for the Atlanta Black Crackers between 1932 and 1939. His most productive recorded season came in 1938, when he posted a 2.01 ERA over 62.2 innings in 12 appearances on the mound.

References

External links
 and Baseball-Reference Black Baseball stats and Seamheads

Year of birth missing
Atlanta Black Crackers players
Baseball pitchers
Baseball players from Georgia (U.S. state)
Sportspeople from Macon, Georgia